Manlobi (also: Malobi) is a village of Ndyuka Maroons in the Sipaliwini District of Suriname. The village is located on an island in the Tapanahony River.

Overview
Manlobi was built by runaway slaves from the plantations. In 1797, it was reported that there was a village on this location.

Manlobi has a school, and a Methodist church. In 2010, a communication mast was placed on the  mountain near the village, providing the village with mobile phone access.

In 2007, Freedom Resources, a gold mining company, procured a large concession on the left shore of the river and built a settlement near the landing ground with a supermarket. The mining activities have attracted skalians, illegal gold dredges, who pollute the river with mercury.

In 2009, the short documentary Trypps #6 by Ben Russell was shot in Manlobi.

References 

Islands of Suriname
Ndyuka settlements
Populated places in Sipaliwini District